Arenas Sociedad Deportiva is a Spanish football team based in San Gregorio, Zaragoza, in the autonomous community of Aragon. Founded on 10 March 1927, the club played for 27 seasons in the Tercera División.

History

Club background
Arenas Sport Club — (1927–41)
Arenas Sociedad Deportiva — (1941–)

Season to season

27 seasons in Tercera División

References

Association football clubs established in 1927
Football clubs in Aragon
1927 establishments in Spain